The Royal Library of Turin is a library located within the ground floor of the Royal Palace of Turin, itself a World Heritage Site in Turin, Italy.

The library contains approximately 200,000 print volumes, 4,500 manuscripts, 3,055 drawings, 187 incunabula predating 1501, 5,019 sixteenth century books, 20,987 pamphlets, 1,500 woks on parchment, 1,112 periodicals, and 400 photo albums, maps, engravings, and prints.

History 
Since his ascent to the throne of the Kingdom of Sardinia in 1831, king Charles Albert wished to boost the cultural standing of the nation, and he did so through the introduction of a series of reforms and the establishment of a number of institutions. The library was then founded in 1842 as one of such institutions, with one of its aims being that of grouping and safeguarding manuscripts collected by the House of Savoy. The library was fitted out by painter and decorator Pelagio Palagi. In 1893 a Russian collector by the name of Theodore Sabachnikoff donated Leonardo da Vinci's Codex on the Flight of Birds to the library's collection as a gift to the king. Further works by Leonardo held by the library include his presumed self-portrait, his study for the angel in his Virgin of the Rocks, and his study for the angel in Verrocchio's The Baptism of Christ.

In 1998, an underground exhibition room was crafted to safely display the collection to the public with the most up-to-date museum technologies.

See also
Head of a Woman (Leonardo, Turin)

References

Libraries in Turin
Residences of the Royal House of Savoy
Buildings and structures in Turin
Tourist attractions in Turin
Royal Palace of Turin
19th-century establishments in the Kingdom of Sardinia
Libraries established in 1842